Nemanja Obradović (born 8 January 1991) is a Serbian handball player who plays for Tatabánya KC and for the Serbian national team.

References

Living people
1991 births
Serbian male handball players
Sportspeople from Kruševac
Expatriate handball players in Poland
Serbian expatriate sportspeople in France
Serbian expatriate sportspeople in Poland
Serbian expatriate sportspeople in North Macedonia
Wisła Płock (handball) players
21st-century Serbian people